Mohamed Shah Alam (1 July 1962 – ) was a Bangladeshi sprinter. In the 100-metres sprint event, he won gold twice in 1985 South Asian Games in Dhaka and in 1987 South Asian Games in Kolkata. Alam competed in the men's 200 metres at the 1988 Summer Olympics.

References

External links
 

1962 births
1989 deaths
Bangladeshi male sprinters
Olympic athletes of Bangladesh
Athletes (track and field) at the 1988 Summer Olympics
Recipients of the Bangladesh National Sports Award
Place of birth missing
Date of death missing
South Asian Games gold medalists for Bangladesh
Road incident deaths in Bangladesh
South Asian Games medalists in athletics
20th-century Bangladeshi people